Acanthurus auranticavus, is a tropical fish with the common names orange-socket surgeonfish and ring-tail surgeon. It was named by Randall in 1956.

Description
Acanthurus auranticavus live in schools which often include other types of fish. The species is distributed in coral reefs in the western-Indian Ocean, as well as the western Pacific, and the Great Barrier Reef.

References

Acanthurus
Fish described in 1956